French Viplavam is a Malayalam comedy movie, which marks the directorial debut of Maju, starring Sunny Wayne, Lal, Chemban Vinod Jose, and Arya Salim. It was released on 26 October 2018. From the very first shot to the last one the film lacked any elements which would enable it to be called as a film.

The film received negative reviews from critics.

Plot
The film revolves around a group of innocent villagers in a calm village known as Kochukadavu, which happened in 1996 after the arrack ban in Kerala. The scenes are based on the escapades of a few characters who are desperate to have a drink, all the time. 

Patta Sisupalan owned an arrack shop, which he had to close down due to the ban. Satyan is a youth fooling around with his gang of friends and is in love with Sisupalan’s daughter.

The story goes along without any definite direction until a twist happens with a foreign lady’s arrival with a bottle of French wine.

Cast
 Sunny Wayne as Satyan
 Lal as Patta Sisupalan
 Chemban Vinod Jose as Chattotty
 Sasi Kalinga        
 Arya Salim
 Lukman    
 Noby Marcose    
 Unnimaya Prasad as Patta's wife
 V. Suresh Thampanoor    
 Pauly Valsan

Music
The film music were composed by Prashant Pillai.

Reception
The Times of India gave it a positive review, rating it 3.5 out of 5.

A review from New Indian Express wrote: "With a half-baked script, the effort is to bring in laughs with comical situations and one liners."

References

External links
 

2018 films
2010s Malayalam-language films
Indian comedy films
2018 comedy films